Wildlife Dictionary is an album by Garland Jeffreys.  It was released in 1997 in Europe only by RCA Records.

Track listing
All tracks composed by Garland Jeffreys; except where indicated
 "That's My Lover" (Garland Jeffreys, Handel Tucker) - 4:31
 "Original Lust" - 4:13
 "Sexuality" (Garland Jeffreys, Joe Dworniak) - 3:58
 "Temptation" (Alan "Troubleshooter" Freedman, Garland Jeffreys) - 4:30
 "Boys and Girls" (Garland Jeffreys, Peter Zizzo) - 5:05
 "Wildlife Dictionary" (Garland Jeffreys, Peter Zizzo) - 4:41
 "Happiness" - 4:20
 "Love Jones" (Garland Jeffreys, The Boilerhouse Boys) - 4:13
 "Afrodiziak" - 4:47
 "Wet Money" - 4:31
 "Gotta Get Away From This World" - 3:59
 "Oceana" - 5:33
 "Lovetown Serenade" (Garland Jeffreys, Handel Tucker) - 4:12

Personnel
Garland Jeffreys - lead and backing vocals
Handel Tucker - organ, piano, synthesizer, drum programming
Peter Zizzo - piano, organ, keyboards, backing vocals; bass on "Wildlife Dictionary"
Richard Arrigo - guitar, mandolin
Pino Palladino - bass
Jeff Bova - piano, organ
Sly Dunbar, Steve Jordan - drums, percussion
Bashiri Johnson - percussion
Paulette Williams, Cindy Mizelle, Danielle LaMette, Ann Tucker, Debra Miller, Jenni Evans, Robin Clark, Tawatha Agee, Gordon Grody, Claire Jeffreys - backing vocals
Lloyd "Gitsy" Willis - guitar on "Original Lust"
Simpleton - toasting on "Original Lust"
Earl "Wire" Lindo - organ on "Original Lust"
Robbie Lyn - keyboards on "Original Lust"
Mark "Led" Ledford - harmony vocals, whistling on "Original Lust"
David Kahne - guitar on "Sexuality" and "Gotta Get Away from This World"
Joe Dworniak - piano, synthesizer, programming on "Sexuality"
Eddie Martinez - guitar on "Sexuality", "Temptation", "Love Jones" and "Afrodiziak"
Tony Cedras - accordion on "Temptation" and "Oceana"
Alan Friedman - piano, programming on "Happiness"; loops, piano, bass on "Gotta Get Away from This World"
Ben Barson - keyboards, programming on "Love Jones"
Luís Jardim - percussion on "Love Jones"
Ben Fowler - synthesizer on "Wet Money"
Chris Champion - loops on "Wet Money"
Alberto Castro, Bruce "The Pocketbook" Purse - trumpet on "Gotta Get Away from This World"
Technical
Ben Fowler, Robert Smith - engineer
Anton Corbijn - photography

External links 
 AMG review

1997 albums
Garland Jeffreys albums
RCA Records albums